DNA-binding protein SMUBP-2, also known as immunoglobulin helicase μ-binding protein 2 (IGHMBP2) and cardiac transcription factor 1 (CATF1) – is a protein that in humans is encoded by the IGHMBP2 gene.

Mutations in the IGHMBP2 gene cause distal spinal muscular atrophy type 1 (distal hereditary motor neuropathy type VI).

References

Further reading